Ahn June-hyuk (born 30 July 1999) is a South Korean footballer who plays as a winger or attacker for Unionistas.

Career

As a youth player, Ahn joined the youth academy of Spanish seventh tier side Roda. After that, he joined the youth academy of Villarreal in the Spanish La Liga.

References

External links

 Ahn June-hyuk at playmakerstats.com 

1999 births
Association football forwards
Association football wingers
Expatriate footballers in Spain
Living people
Primera Federación players
Segunda División B players
South Korean expatriate sportspeople in Spain
South Korean footballers
South Korea youth international footballers
Tercera División players
Unionistas de Salamanca CF players
Villarreal CF B players
Villarreal CF C players